Argocoffeopsis lemblinii is an extinct relative of the coffee plant, within the family Rubiaceae. It is only known from the holotype collected by French botanist Auguste Jean Baptiste Chevalier in January 1907 in the valley of the Agnéby river in Côte d'Ivoire, and was not found during subsequent surveys. Argocoffeopsis lemblinii was a much branched shrub which could reach a height of about 50 centimetres. The flowers were white, the small fruits spheroid. It grew in a forest habitat.

References 

 J. Hutchinson & J.M. Dalziel: Flora of West Tropical Africa: Vol. 2 Ericaceae-Labiatae. Crown Agents, 1963
 Ronald William John Keay: Notes on Rubiaceae for the "Flora of West Tropical Africa": II. In: Bulletin du Jardin botanique de l'État à Bruxelles, Vol. 28, Fasc. 3 (Sep. 30, 1958), p. 291-298
 Auguste Chevalier (1947) Les caféiers du globe. III. Systématiques des caféiers et faux caféiers. Maladies et insectes nuisible. Vol. 28, Fascicule III. Encyclopédie biologique, Paris: P Lechevalier. 
 Jean-François Leroy: Un faux Caféier à rechercher en Côte d'Ivoire : l'Argocoffea lemblini (A. Chev.) J. Agric. Trop. Bot. Appl. 10 : 259–261.

External links 
 World Checklist of Rubiaceae
 Image of the holotype at Aluka
 

Coffeeae
Flora of Ivory Coast
Extinct plants
Extinct biota of Africa
Plant extinctions since 1500
Taxa named by Auguste Chevalier